Susan Day  (born 29 October 1972) is an English female rugby union footballer who played fullback for London Wasps Ladies and for England.

Career
Day made her  debut versus  in 1997. She was selected for the 2006 Six Nations Squad. She appeared again for the 2007 Six Nations opener. She can play on the wing, in the centre or at fullback. Sue played in three Rugby World Cups and is England's top try scorer with 61 tries in 59 caps. Sue or 'Daisy' as she is known to her team mates is the top try scorer in IRB world cups, with 19 tries. After retiring from 15's, Sue returned to the international game, captaining Simon Amor and Mike Friday's  7's squad to the 7's world cup in March 2009.

In 2013 Day became the first female president of Wasps FC in their 146-year history.

She was appointed Member of the Order of the British Empire (MBE) in the 2020 Birthday Honours for services to gender equality in sport.

References

External links 
 RFUW
 Sue Day

1972 births
Living people
England women's international rugby union players
English female rugby union players
Members of the Order of the British Empire
Oxford University RFC players
Rugby union fullbacks
Wasps RFC players
England international women's rugby sevens players